St. Ignatius School, Rwanda, is a private Catholic primary and secondary school located in Kigali, the capital city of Rwanda. The school was founded by the Society of Jesus in 2006. It is coeducational and includes kindergarten through high school. The school relies heavily on funds from abroad, with a major benefactor being the Grace Foundation which was founded to support Jesuit schools in Rwanda.

In 2015, St. Ignatius School was ranked second in the nation based on the performance on the National Exam.

See also

 Education in Rwanda
 List of Jesuit schools

References  

Jesuit primary schools in Rwanda
Jesuit secondary schools in Rwanda
Educational institutions established in 2006
2006 establishments in Rwanda
Schools in Kigali